The 2016 NHK Trophy was the final event of six in the 2016–17 ISU Grand Prix of Figure Skating, a senior-level international invitational competition series. It was held at the Makomanai Sekisuiheim Ice Arena in Sapporo on November 25–27. Medals were awarded in the disciplines of men's singles, ladies' singles, pair skating, and ice dancing. Skaters earned points toward qualifying for the 2016–17 Grand Prix Final.

Entries
The ISU published the preliminary assignments on June 30, 2016.

Changes to initial assignments

Results

Men

Ladies

Pairs

Ice dancing
Tessa Virtue and Scott Moir set a new world record for the short dance (79.47 points) and for the combined total (195.84 points).

References

External links
 2016 NHK Trophy at the International Skating Union

NHK Trophy
NHK Trophy
NHK Trophy